Lumut Bypass, Federal Route 100, is a highway bypass in Manjung district, Perak, Malaysia. It is also a main bypass to Lumut and Teluk Batik. The motorists will be using this road from Ipoh-Lumut Highway (Federal Route 5) to Pangkor Island. The Kilometre Zero of the Federal Route 100 starts at Simpang Empat, Teluk Muroh junctions, at its interchange with the Federal Route 18, connecting Lumut to Sitiawan.

Features

At most sections, the Federal Route 100 was built under the JKR R5 road standard, allowing maximum speed limit of up to 90 km/h.

List of intersections

References

100
Highways in Malaysia